1 Special Training Unit was a physical training of the South African Infantry.

Origin
1 Special Training Unit had a similar function as the World War 2 era  PT Branch but for the South Africa Coloured Corps recruits.

The badge was based on Doc (Lt Col) Danie Cravens Physical Training Brigade at Kimberly during World War 2, the aim to build up under nourished and understrength recruits (as a result of the great Depression)
The badge represented the Greek discus thrower (Diskobolus) from which the base and the post office got its name.

Insignia

References

External links

Military units and formations of South Africa in the Border War
Military units and formations of South Africa